The Basketball Africa League Dikembe Mutombo Defensive Player of the Year is an annual Basketball Africa League (BAL) award given to the best defensive player of a given season. The award is named after Congolese basketball legend Dikembe Mutombo. The award was first handed out in the inaugural season to Anas Osama Mahmoud.

Players of the four teams that qualified for the semifinals can be selected. The selection committee exists of a number of BAL experts, including the head coaches of all teams.

Winners

Notes

References

Defensive Player of the Year